

Result of municipal elections
Results of the 1934 municipal elections.

References

Local elections in Norway
1930s elections in Norway
Norway
Local